Downtown Buda Historic District is a six-block historic commercial area located in Buda, Texas.  The oldest building dates from 1881 when the town was created with the arrival of the International-Great Northern Railroad (I&GN).  The town experienced moderate success for the next forty years, but the downtown area never grew beyond its track-side beginnings.

Twenty-eight buildings contribute to the historic district, most date from the early 1900s, the most recent is from 1934. The district was added to the National Register of Historic Places in November 7, 2003 as an example of a late 19th to early 20th century railroad town.

Photo gallery

Shaun Bonn

National Register of Historic Places listings in Hays County, Texas

References

External links

Hays County, Texas
Historic districts on the National Register of Historic Places in Texas
National Register of Historic Places in Hays County, Texas